Qubaxəlilli (also Khalilli and Kuba-Khalilli) is a village and municipality in the Ismailli Rayon of Azerbaijan.  It has a population of 2,467. The municipality consists of the villages of Qubaxəlilli and Çərmədil.

References 

Populated places in Ismayilli District